Herman Ponsteen (born 27 March 1953 in Hellendoorn, Overijssel) is a retired track cyclist from the Netherlands, who represented his native country twice at two consecutive Summer Olympics, starting in 1972 (Munich, West Germany). Four years later he won the silver medal at the 1976 Summer Olympics in Montreal, Quebec, Canada, in the Men's 4.000m Individual Pursuit.

See also
 List of Dutch Olympic cyclists

References

External links

  Dutch Olympic Committee

1953 births
Living people
People from Hellendoorn
Dutch male cyclists
Cyclists at the 1972 Summer Olympics
Cyclists at the 1976 Summer Olympics
Olympic cyclists of the Netherlands
Olympic silver medalists for the Netherlands
Dutch track cyclists
Olympic medalists in cycling
Medalists at the 1976 Summer Olympics
Cyclists from Overijssel